Jesus is called the Son of God in the Bible's New Testament, and in mainstream Christian denominations he is God the Son, the second Person in the Trinity. He is believed to be the Jewish messiah (the Christ) who is prophesied in the Hebrew Bible, which is called the Old Testament in Christianity. Through his crucifixion and subsequent resurrection, God offered humans salvation and eternal life, that Jesus died to atone for sin to make humanity right with God.

These teachings emphasize that as the Lamb of God, Jesus chose to suffer nailed to the cross at Calvary as a sign of his obedience to the will of God, as an "agent and servant of God". Jesus's choice positions him as a man of obedience, in contrast to Adam's disobedience. According to the New Testament, after God raised him from the dead, Jesus ascended to heaven to sit at the right hand of God, and he will return to earth again for the Last Judgment and the establishment of the Kingdom of God.

In the gospel accounts, Jesus also debated with fellow Jews on how to best follow God, performed miracles, taught in parables, and gathered disciples. Christians follow the moral teachings of Jesus.

While there has been theological debate over the nature of Jesus, Trinitarian Christians believe that Jesus is the Logos, God incarnate, God the Son, and "true God and true man"—both fully divine and fully human. Jesus, having become fully human in all respects, suffered the pains and temptations of a mortal man, yet he did not sin.

Core teachings 
Although Christian views of Jesus vary, it is possible to summarize the key elements of the beliefs shared by major Christian denominations by analyzing their catechetical or confessional texts. Christian views of Jesus are derived from various biblical sources, particularly from the canonical gospels and New Testament letters such as the Pauline epistles. Christians predominantly hold that these works are historically true.

Those Christian groups or denominations which are committed to what are considered biblically orthodox Christianity nearly all agree that Jesus:
was born of a virgin
is a human being who is also fully God
had never sinned during his existence
was crucified and buried in a tomb
rose from the dead on the third day
eventually ascended back to God the Father
will return to earth
Some groups which are considered to be Christian hold beliefs which are considered to be heterodox. For example, believers in monophysitism reject the idea that Christ has two natures, one human and one divine.

The five major milestones in the gospel narrative of the life of Jesus are his baptism, transfiguration, Crucifixion, Resurrection and Ascension. These are usually bracketed by two other episodes: his nativity at the beginning and the sending of the Paraclete (Holy Spirit) at the end. The gospel accounts of the teachings of Jesus are often presented in terms of specific categories involving his "works and words", e.g., his ministry, parables and miracles.

Christians not only attach theological significance to the works of Jesus, but also to his name. Devotions to the name of Jesus go back to the earliest days of Christianity. These exist today both in Eastern and Western Christianity—both Catholic and Protestant.

Christians predominantly profess that through Jesus' life, death, and Resurrection, he restored humanity's communion with God with the blood of the New Covenant. His death on a cross is understood as a redemptive sacrifice: the source of humanity's salvation and the atonement for sin which had entered human history through the sin of Adam.

Christ, Logos and Son of God

Most Christians generally consider Jesus to be the Christ, the long-awaited Messiah, as well as the one and only Son of God. The opening words in the Gospel of Mark (1:1), "The beginning of the gospel of Jesus Christ, the Son of God", provide Jesus with the two distinct attributions as Christ and as the Son of God. His divinity is again re-affirmed in Mark 1:11.  Matthew 1:1 which begins by calling Jesus the Christ and in verse 16 explains it again with the affirmation: "Jesus, who is called Christ".

In the Pauline epistles, the word Christ is so closely associated with Jesus that apparently for the early Christians there was no need to claim that Jesus was Christ, for that was considered widely accepted among them. Hence Paul could use the term Christos with no confusion about who it referred to, and as in 1 Corinthians 4:15 and Romans 12:5 he could use expressions such as "in Christ" to refer to the followers of Jesus.

In the New Testament, the title "Son of God" is applied to Jesus on many occasions, from the Annunciation up to the Crucifixion. The declaration that Jesus is the Son of God is made by many individuals in the New Testament, and on two occasions by God the Father as a voice from Heaven, and is asserted by Jesus himself.

In Christology, the concept that Christ is the Logos (i.e., "The Word") has been important in establishing the doctrine of the divinity of Christ and his position as God the Son in the Trinity as set forth in the Chalcedonian Creed. This derives from the opening of the Gospel of John, commonly translated into English as: "In the beginning was the Word, and the Word was with God, and the Word was God." λόγος in the original Koine Greek is translated as Word and in theological discourse, this is often left in its English transliterated form, Logos.
The easiest way to understand this is the teaching that Jesus (The Word of God) came from the bosom of God the Father and became a living being who then translated into a foetus in the womb of (Virgin Mary) through a supernatural means, as professed by believers in Christ.

The pre-existence of Christ refers to the existence of Christ before his incarnation as Jesus. One of the relevant New Testament passages is John 1:1-18 where, in the Trinitarian view, Christ is identified with a pre-existent divine hypostasis called the Logos or Word. This doctrine is reiterated in John 17:5 when Jesus refers to the glory which he had with the Father "before the world was" during the Farewell Discourse.  also refers to the Father loving Jesus "before the foundation of the world". Nontrinitarian views about the pre-existence of Christ vary, with some rejecting it and others accepting it.

Following the Apostolic Age, from the 2nd century forward, several controversies developed about how the human and divine are related within the person of Jesus. Eventually in 451, the concept of a hypostatic union was decreed, namely that Jesus is both fully divine and fully human. However, differences among Christian denominations continued thereafter, with some rejecting the hypostatic union in favor of monophysitism.

Incarnation, Nativity and Second Adam

The above verse from Colossians regards the birth of Jesus as the model for all creation.

Paul the Apostle viewed the birth of Jesus as an event of cosmic significance which brought forth a "new man" who undid the damage caused by the fall of the first man, Adam. Just as the Johannine view of Jesus as the incarnate Logos proclaims the universal relevance of his birth, the Pauline perspective emphasizes the birth of a new man and a new world in the birth of Jesus. Paul's eschatological view of Jesus counter-positions him as a new man of morality and obedience, in contrast to Adam. Unlike Adam, the new man born in Jesus obeys God and ushers in a world of morality and salvation.

In the Pauline view, Adam is positioned as the first man and Jesus as the second: Adam, having corrupted himself by his disobedience, also infected humanity and left it with a curse as its inheritance. The birth of Jesus counterbalanced the fall of Adam, bringing forth redemption and repairing the damage done by Adam.

In the 2nd century Church Father Irenaeus writes:
"When He became incarnate and was made man, He commenced afresh the long line of human beings, and furnished us, in a brief, comprehensive manner, with salvation; so that what we had lost in Adam—namely to be according to the image and likeness of God- that we might recover in Christ Jesus."Walker, Williston. A History of the Christian Church, 2010. . pp. 65-66

In patristic theology, Paul's contrasting of Jesus as the new man versus Adam provided a framework for discussing the uniqueness of the birth of Jesus and the ensuing events of his life. The nativity of Jesus thus began to serve as the starting point for "cosmic Christology" in which the birth, life and Resurrection of Jesus have universal implications. The concept of Jesus as the "new man" repeats in the cycle of birth and rebirth of Jesus from his nativity to his Resurrection: following his birth, through his morality and obedience to the Father, Jesus began a "new harmony" in the relationship between God the Father and man. The nativity and Resurrection of Jesus thus created the author and exemplar of a new humanity. In this view, the birth, death and Resurrection of Jesus brought about salvation, undoing the damage of Adam.

As the biological son of David, Jesus would be of the Jewish race, ethnicity, nation, and culture. One argument against this would be a contradiction in Jesus' genealogies: Matthew saying he is the son of Solomon and Luke saying he is the son of Nathan—Solomon and Nathan being brothers. John of Damascus taught that there is no contradiction, for Nathan wed Solomon's wife after Solomon died in accordance with scripture, namely, yibbum (the mitzvah that a man must marry his brother's childless widow).

Jesus grew up in Galilee and much of his ministry took place there. The languages spoken in Galilee and Judea during the 1st century AD include Jewish Palestinian Aramaic, Hebrew, and Greek, with Aramaic being predominant. There is substantial consensus that Jesus gave most of his teachings in Aramaic in the Galilean dialect.

Besides this, the New Testament includes no descriptions of Jesus' appearance before his death and the gospel narratives are generally indifferent to people's racial appearance or features.

Ministry

In the canonical gospels, the Ministry of Jesus begins with his baptism in the countryside of Judea, near the River Jordan and ends in Jerusalem, following the Last Supper. The Gospel of Luke (3:23) states that Jesus was "about 30 years of age" at the start of his ministry. The date of the start of his ministry has been estimated at around AD 27 to 29 and the end in the range AD 30 to 36.

Jesus' early Galilean ministry begins when after his baptism, he goes back to Galilee from his time in the Judean desert. In this early period he preaches around Galilee and recruits his first disciples who begin to travel with him and eventually form the core of the early Church. The major Galilean ministry which begins in Matthew 8 includes the commissioning of the Twelve Apostles, and covers most of the ministry of Jesus in Galilee. The final Galilean ministry begins after the death of John the Baptist as Jesus prepares to go to Jerusalem.

In the later Judean ministry Jesus starts his final journey to Jerusalem through Judea. As Jesus travels towards Jerusalem, in the later Perean ministry, about one third the way down from the Sea of Galilee along the River Jordan, he returns to the area where he was baptized.

The final ministry in Jerusalem is sometimes called the Passion Week and begins with the Jesus' triumphal entry into Jerusalem. The gospels provide more details about the final ministry than the other periods, devoting about one third of their text to the last week of the life of Jesus in Jerusalem.

Teachings, parables and miracles

In the New Testament the teachings of Jesus are presented in terms of his "words and works". The words of Jesus include several sermons, in addition to parables that appear throughout the narrative of the Synoptic Gospels (the gospel of John includes no parables). The works include the miracles and other acts performed during his ministry.

Although the Canonical Gospels are the major source of the teachings of Jesus, the Pauline epistles, which were likely written decades before the gospels, provide some of the earliest written accounts of the teachings of Jesus.

The New Testament does not present the teachings of Jesus as merely his own teachings, but equates the words of Jesus with divine revelation, with John the Baptist stating in John 3:34: "For the one whom God has sent speaks the words of God, for God gives the Spirit without limit." and Jesus stating in John 7:16: “My teaching is not my own. It comes from the one who sent me". In Matthew 11:27 Jesus claims divine knowledge, stating: "No one knows the Son except the Father and no one knows the Father except the Son", asserting the mutual knowledge he has with the Father.

One of the most important of Jesus' teachings is his second coming in Matthew 24 and Luke 21. There Jesus explained the signs of the last days, popularly known as the end-time. These are the days that precedes the second coming of Jesus Christ, there he spoke of the signs of the end of days and what will happen to the believers in Christ, the persecution and the troubles that will come upon the world. The second coming of Jesus is mainly divided into two, namely; the Rapture and the Second Coming. The rapture being the time Jesus comes in the air to take up his saints to Heaven for a period of seven years and the second coming, being a time he comes with the saints to rule the earth for a thousand years. It is also referred to as the millennial reign.

Discourses

The gospels include several discourses by Jesus on specific occasions, such as the Farewell discourse delivered after the Last Supper, the night before his Crucifixion. Although some of the teachings of Jesus are reported as taking place within the formal atmosphere of a synagogue (e.g., in ) many  of the discourses are more like conversations than formal lectures.

The Gospel of Matthew has a structured set of sermons, often grouped as the Five Discourses of Matthew which present many of the key teachings of Jesus. Each of the five discourses has some parallel passages in the Gospel of Mark or the Gospel of Luke. The five discourses in Matthew begin with the Sermon on the Mount, which encapsulates many of the moral teaching of Jesus and which is one of the best known and most quoted elements of the New Testament. The Sermon on the Mount includes the Beatitudes which describe the character of the people of the Kingdom of God, expressed as "blessings". The Beatitudes focus on love and humility rather than force and exaction and echo the key ideals of Jesus' teachings on spirituality and compassion. The other discourses in Matthew include the Missionary Discourse in Matthew 10 and the Discourse on the Church in Matthew 18, providing instructions to the disciples and laying the foundation of the codes of conduct for the anticipated community of followers.

Parables

The parables of Jesus represent a major component of his teachings in the gospels, the approximately thirty parables forming about one third of his recorded teachings. The parables may appear within longer sermons, as well as other places within the narrative. Jesus' parables are seemingly simple and memorable stories, often with imagery, and each conveys a teaching which usually relates the physical world to the spiritual world.

In the 19th century, Lisco and Fairbairn stated that in the parables of Jesus, "the image borrowed from the visible world is accompanied by a truth from the invisible (spiritual) world" and that the parables of Jesus are not "mere similitudes which serve the purpose of illustration, but are internal analogies where nature becomes a witness for the spiritual world". Similarly, in the 20th century, calling a parable "an earthly story with a heavenly meaning", William Barclay states that the parables of Jesus use familiar examples to lead others' minds towards heavenly concepts. He suggests that Jesus did not form his parables merely as analogies but based on an "inward affinity between the natural and the spiritual order."

One of the major reasons why Jesus spoke in parables to the Jews was explained to the disciples of Jesus by Jesus himself. It is found in Matthew 13:13-14; there Jesus explains why he used much of parables to the people of Israel. Jesus explained that it was so for the fulfillment of the prophecy of Isaiah the prophet, and this is found in Isaiah 6:9-10. This was for the people of Israel not to understand and realize who Jesus is and accept him, he purposely did this to make provision for Gentiles to be part of the children of God.

Miracles of Jesus 

In Christian teachings, the miracles of Jesus were as much a vehicle for his message as were his words. Many of the miracles emphasize the importance of faith, for instance in cleansing ten lepers, Jesus did not say: "My power has saved you" but says "Rise and go; your faith has saved you." Similarly, in the Walking on Water miracle, Apostle Peter learns an important lesson about faith in that as his faith wavers, he begins to sink. 

One characteristic shared among all miracles of Jesus in the Gospel accounts is that he delivered benefits freely and never requested or accepted any form of payment for his healing miracles, unlike some high priests of his time who charged those who were healed. In Matthew 10:8 he advised his disciples to heal the sick, raise the dead, cleanse those who have leprosy, and drive out demons without payment and stated: "Freely you have received; freely give".

Christians in general believe that Jesus' miracles were actual historical events and that his miraculous works were an important part of his life, attesting to his divinity and the Hypostatic union, i.e., the dual natures of Christ's humanity and divinity in one hypostasis. Christians believe that while Jesus' experiences of hunger, weariness, and death were evidences of his humanity, the miracles were evidences of his deity.

Christian authors also view the miracles of Jesus not merely as acts of power and omnipotence, but as works of love and mercy: they were performed to show compassion for sinful and suffering humanity. Authors Ken and Jim Stocker state that "every single miracle Jesus performed was an act of love". And each miracle involves specific teachings.

Since according to the Gospel of John it was impossible to narrate all the miracles performed by Jesus, the Catholic Encyclopedia states that the miracles presented in the Gospels were selected for a twofold reason: first for the manifestation of God's glory, and then for their evidential value. Jesus referred to his "works" as evidences of his mission and his divinity, and in  he declared that his miracles have greater evidential value than the testimony of John the Baptist.

Crucifixion and atonement

The accounts of the Crucifixion and subsequent Resurrection of Jesus provide a rich background for Christological analysis, from the canonical gospels to the Pauline epistles.

Johannine "agency christology" combines the concept that Jesus is the Son of his Father with the idea that he has come into the world as his Father's agent, commissioned and sent by the Father to represent the Father and to accomplish his Father's work. Implied in each Synoptic portrayal of Jesus is the doctrine that the salvation Jesus gives is inseparable from Jesus himself and his divine identity. Sonship and agency come together in the Synoptic gospels only in the Parable of the Vineyard. The submission of Jesus to crucifixion is a sacrifice made as an agent of God or servant of God, for the sake of eventual victory. This builds upon the salvific theme of the Gospel of John which begins in John 1:36 with John the Baptist's proclamation: "The Lamb of God who takes away the sins of the world". Further reinforcement of the concept is provided in Revelation 21:14 where the "lamb slain but standing" is the only one worthy of handling the scroll (i.e., the book) containing the names of those who are to be saved.

A central element in the Christology presented in the Acts of the Apostles is the affirmation of the belief that the death of Jesus by crucifixion happened "with the foreknowledge of God, according to a definite plan". In this view, as in Acts 2:23, the cross is not viewed as a scandal, for the Crucifixion of Jesus "at the hands of the lawless" is viewed as the fulfilment of the plan of God.

Paul's Christology has a specific focus on the death and Resurrection of Jesus. For Paul, the Crucifixion of Jesus is directly related to his Resurrection and the term "the cross of Christ" used in Galatians 6:12 may be viewed as his abbreviation of the message of the gospels. For Paul, the Crucifixion of Jesus was not an isolated event in history, but a cosmic event with significant eschatological consequences, as in 1 Corinthians 2:8. In the Pauline view, Jesus, obedient to the point of death (Philippians 2:8) died "at the right time" (Romans 4:25) based on the plan of God. For Paul the "power of the cross" is not separable from the Resurrection of Jesus.

John Calvin supported the "agent of God" Christology and argued that in his trial in Pilate's Court Jesus could have successfully argued for his innocence, but instead submitted to crucifixion in obedience to the Father. This Christological theme continued into the 20th century, both in the Eastern and Western Churches. In the Eastern Church Sergei Bulgakov argued that the Crucifixion of Jesus was "pre-eternally" determined by the Father before the creation of the world, to redeem humanity from the disgrace caused by the fall of Adam. In the Western Church, Karl Rahner elaborated on the analogy that the blood of the Lamb of God (and the water from the side of Jesus) shed at the Crucifixion had a cleansing nature, similar to baptismal water.

Mormons believe that the Crucifixion was the culmination of Christ's atonement, which began in the Garden of Gethsemane.

Resurrection, Ascension, and Second Coming

The New Testament teaches that the Resurrection of Jesus is a foundation of the Christian faith.  Christians, through faith in the working of God are spiritually resurrected with Jesus, and are redeemed so that they may walk in a new way of life.

In the teachings of the apostolic Church, the Resurrection was seen as heralding a new era. Forming a theology of the Resurrection fell to Apostle Paul. It was not enough for Paul to simply repeat elementary teachings, but as  states, "go beyond the initial teachings about Christ and advance to maturity". Fundamental to Pauline theology is the connection between Christ's Resurrection and redemption. Paul explained the importance of the Resurrection of Jesus as the cause and basis of the hope of Christians to share a similar experience in :
But Christ has indeed been raised from the dead, the firstfruits of those who have fallen asleep. For since death came through a man, the resurrection of the dead comes also through a man. For as in Adam all die, so in Christ all will be made alive.

If the cross stands at the center of Paul's theology, so does the Resurrection: unless the one died the death of all, the all would have little to celebrate in the Resurrection of the one. Paul taught that, just as Christians share in Jesus' death in baptism, so they will share in his Resurrection for Jesus was designated the Son of God by his Resurrection.  Paul's views went against the thoughts of the Greek philosophers to whom a bodily resurrection meant a new imprisonment in a corporeal body, which was what they wanted to avoid, given that for them the corporeal and the material fettered the spirit. At the same time, Paul believed that the newly resurrected body would be a spiritual body—immortal, glorified and powerful, in contrast to an earthly body which is mortal, dishonored and weak.

The Apostolic Fathers, discussed the death and Resurrection of Jesus, including Ignatius (50−115), Polycarp (69−155), and Justin Martyr (100−165). Following the conversion of Constantine and the liberating Edict of Milan in 313, the ecumenical councils of the 4th, 5th and 6th centuries, that focused on Christology helped shape the Christian understanding of the redemptive nature of Resurrection, and influenced both the development of its iconography, and its use within liturgy.

Nontrinitarian perspectives 

The doctrine of the Trinity, including the belief that Jesus is a Person of the Trinity, is not universally accepted among Christians. Nontrinitarian Christian groups include the Church of Jesus Christ of Latter-day Saints, Unitarians and Jehovah's Witnesses. Though modern nontrinitarian groups all reject the doctrine of the Trinity, their views still differ widely on the nature of Jesus. Some do not believe that Jesus is God, instead believing that he was a messenger from God, or prophet, or the perfect created human. This is the view espoused by ancient sects such as the Ebionites, and modern-day Unitarians. It should also be noted that the Roman Catholic Church changed at various times in the fourth century with the Second Creed of Sirmium (357 AD) proclaiming and endorsing a nontrinitarian view "And to none can it be a question that the Father is greater. For no one can doubt that the Father is greater in honor and dignity and Godhead, and in the very name of Father, the Son Himself testifying, ‘The Father that sent me is greater than I’ (John 10:29, 14:28) And no one is ignorant, that it is catholic doctrine, that there are two persons of Father and Son, and that the Father is greater, and the Son subordinated to the Father"

See also

Further reading

References